

A 
 A priori and a posteriori
 Absolute
 Absolute time and space
 Abstract and concrete
 Adiaphora
 Aesthetic emotions
 Aesthetic interpretation
 Agathusia and aschimothusia
 Alief
 All men are created equal
 Analytic-synthetic distinction
 Anthropic principle
 Antinomy
 Antinomian
 Apeiron
 Arborescent
 Artha
 Art manifesto
 Atman
 Aufheben
 Autonomy
 Avant-garde
 Avatar
 Avadhuta

B 
 Beauty
 Being
 Belief
 Binary opposition
 Biofact
 Body without organs
 Boredom
 Brahman
 Brahmanda
 Brain in a vat
 Brute fact

C 
 Cambridge change
 Camp
 Cartesian Other
 Cartesian Self
 Categorical imperative
 Categorization
 Category of being
 Causal adequacy principle
 Causality
 Chakra
 Charvaka
 Chaitanya
 Choice
 Civic virtue
 Class consciousness
 Class
 Cogito ergo sum
 Cognitive bias
 Cognitive closure
 Commensurability
 Common good
 Common sense
 Composition of Causes
 Compossibility
 Conatus
 Concept
 Condition of possibility
 Conjecture
 Conscience
 Consent
 Construct
 Creativity
 Crazy wisdom
 Cultural hegemony
 Cultural sensibility
 Cuteness

D 
 Daimonic
 Darshana
 De dicto and de re
 Definition
 Descriptive knowledge
 Desiring-production
 Dharma
 Dhyana
 Diksha
 Disciplinary institution
 Discourse
 Disgust
 Dispositional and occurrent belief
 Distributive justice
 Distrust
 Documentality
 Dogma
 Duty
 Dwelling

E 
 Ecotechnics
 Ecstasy
 Efficient cause
 Elegance
 Embodied cognition
 Emergence
 Empirical method
 Empirical relationship
 Empirical research
 Entertainment
 Entity
 Epistemic injustice
 Epistemic virtue
 Epoché
 Eroticism
 Essence
 Eternity
 Ethics of care
 Eudaimonia
 Eupraxis
 Existence
 Existential phenomenology
 Experience

F 
 Fact
 Fidelity
 Final anthropic principle
 Final cause
 Formal cause
 Formal theorem
 Four causes
 Free will
 Friendship

G 
 Gemeinschaft and Gesellschaft
 Gettier problem
 Cooperative principle (Gricean maxims)

H 
 Haecceity
 Half-truth
 Happiness
 Harmony
 Hate speech
 Here is a hand
 Heteronomy
 History and Class Consciousness
 Human rights

I 
 Idea
 Ideal (ethics)
 Ideal speech situation
 Identity
 Ideological repression
 Ideology
 Ignoramus et ignorabimus
 Ignorance
 I know that I know nothing
 Immanence
 Immanent critique
 Implicate and explicate order according to David Bohm
 Infallibility
 Inference
 Infinity
 Information
 Injustice
 Innocence
 Instantiation principle
 Institutional cruelty
 Intellectual responsibility
 Intention
 Integral philosophy
 Integral theory
 Integral yoga
 Interpellation
 Intrinsic and extrinsic properties
 Intuition
 Involution
 Ius indigenatus

J 
 Judgement
 Jus sanguinis
 Jus soli
 Just War
 Justice

K 
 Kathekon
 KK thesis
 Knowledge
 Kundalini energy
 Kaula
 Kalachakra
 Kala
 Karma
 Karma yoga

L 
 Laïcité
 Last man
 League of peace
 Logic
 Life imitating art
 Logical consequence
 Logical constant
 Logical form
 Logical truth
 Logos
 Love
 Loyalty

M 
 Magnificence
 Mansion of Many Apartments
 Mantra
 Marx's theory of alienation
 Marx's theory of human nature
 Master-slave dialectic
 Material cause
 Matter
 Max Scheler's Concept of Ressentiment
 Maya
 Meaning
 Meaning of life
 Mental representation
 Mercy
 Mimesis
 Mind
 Minority
 Moksha
 Molyneux's Problem
 Moral responsibility
 Motion
 Mundane reason

N 
 Name
 Nation
 Natural and legal rights
 Nature
 Necessary and sufficient condition
 Negative capability
 Nonmaleficence
 Norm of reciprocity
 Norm
 Normative science
 Notion

O 
 Object
 Objectivity
 Om
 Omphalos hypothesis
 Ontology

P 
 Panopticon
 Paradox
 Passions
 Pattern
 Peace
 Percept
 Perception
 Peripatetic axiom
 Perpetual peace
 Philosophical analysis
 Philosophy of futility
 Physical body
 Physis
 Pneuma
 Political consciousness
 Polychotomous key
 Possible world
 Posthegemony
 Prakriti
 Purusha
 Pratyabhijna
 Presupposition
 Primum non nocere
 Principle
 Principle of double effect
 Problem of induction
 Problem of other minds
 Prohairesis
 Property
 Propositional attitude

Q 
 Qualia
 Quality
 Quantity
 Quidditas

R 
 Rasa
 Rationality
 Real freedom
 Reason
 Reciprocity
 Reference
 Reform
 Regress argument
 Rajas
 Raja yoga
 Ren
 Right to exist
 Righteousness
 Rights
 Ring of Gyges
 Rule of Rescue

S 
 Satchidananda
 Sattva
 Sahaja
 Samarasa
 Satori
 Sea of Beauty
 Self
 Self-realization
 Semantics
 Sense data
 Set
 Shabda
 Shakti
 Sunyata
 Slippery slope
 Simulacrum
 Simulated reality
 Simulation hypothesis
 Sittlichkeit
 Social contract
 Society
 Soku hi
 Sortal
 Speculative reason
 State of nature
 Style
 Sub specie aeternitatis
 Subject
 Sublime
 Substance theory
 Substantial form
 Substitution
 Suffering
 Supermind
 Superrationality
 Supertask
 Symbol
 Syntax

T 
 Taste
 Tantra
 Telos
 The Golden Rule
 The saying and the said
 Theorem
 Theory of justification
 Thought
 Thrownness
 Thumos
 Tamas
 Ti
 Time
 Trailokya (Triloka)
 Transcendent
 Transcendental apperception
 Transworld identity
 Trika
 Triratna
 Trilok (Jainism)
 Trust
 Truth
 Truth value
 Type

U 
 Übermensch
 Unity of science
 Unity of the proposition
 Universal
 Universality
 Unobservable
 Utility

V 
 Validity
 Value
 Vamachara
 Vajrayana
 Virtual
 Virtue

W 
 Well-founded phenomenon
 Work of art
 Wrong

Y 
 Yi
 Yoga
 Yidam

Z 
 Zeitgeist